Antillón is a municipality located in the province of Huesca, Aragon, Spain. , (INE), the municipality has a population of 150 inhabitants.

The parish church was built between the eleventh and the sixteenth century, so it has parts in Romanesque style, and parts in Gothic one.  There is also an antique oil manufacturing factory which has been remodeled and can show us how the people of the nineteenth worked.

References 

Municipalities in the Province of Huesca